Kyiv Airport may refer to:

Boryspil Airport, the main airport serving Kyiv, Ukraine
Kyiv International Airport, a smaller secondary airport serving Kyiv, Ukraine
Hostomel Airport, an airport used for freight
 Kyiv Brovary Airport, a former airport serving Kyiv, Ukraine